Schmölln is a town in Thuringia, Germany, landkreis of Altenburger Land. It lies on the river Sprotte.

Geography

Neighboring municipalities
Municipalities in the district of Altenburger Land neighboring Schmölln include: Starkenberg, Dobitschen, Göllnitz, Göhren, Altenburg, Nobitz, the town of Gößnitz, Ponitz, Heyersdorf, Thonhausen, Vollmershain, Posterstein and Löbichau.

Subdivisions
Schmölln consists of the town Schmölln and 44 local subdivisions (Ortsteile):

Altkirchen
Bohra
Brandrübel
Braunshain
Burkersdorf
Dobra
Drogen
Gimmel
Gödissa
Göldschen
Graicha
Großbraunshain
Großstöbnitz
Großtauschwitz
Hartha
Hartroda
Illsitz
Jauern
Kakau
Kleinmückern
Kleintauscha
Kleintauschwitz
Kratschütz
Kummer
Lohma
Lumpzig
Mohlis
Nöbden
Nitzschka
Nöbdenitz
Nödenitzsch
Papiermühle
Platschütz
Prehna
Röthenitz
Schloßig
Selka
Sommeritz
Trebula
Untschen
Weißbach
Wildenbörten
Zagkwitz
Zschernitzsch

History

Within the German Empire (1871–1918), Schmölln was part of the Duchy of Saxe-Altenburg. From 1952 to 1990, it was part of the Bezirk Leipzig of East Germany.

Important Dates:
1066--Schmölln is first mentioned in writing as ABBATIA ZMULNA
1127--Building of the cloister on the Pfefferberg
13th - 16th centuries--Schmölln is a pilgrimage destination (Marienwallfahrtsort)
1525--Destruction of the cloister on the Pfefferberg
2016 - An underage Somalian asylum seeker jumps to his death, allegedly encouraged by onlookers

Incorporation
On March 8, 1994, Weißbach was incorporated into Schmölln, and on January 1, 1996, Großstöbnitz followed. The former municipalities Altkirchen, Drogen, Lumpzig, Nöbdenitz and Wildenbörten were merged into Schmölln in January 2019.

Business and transport
Schmölln is located at a connection of Bundesautobahn 4 (Connection 61 Schmölln) and has a train station on the Middle-Germany Link (Weimar–Glauchau).

References

External links
 

Altenburger Land
Duchy of Saxe-Altenburg